Co-op Atlantic is a Canadian collectively owned consumers' cooperative. The cooperative is legally owned by its members and controlled by a board of directors. The head offices of Co-op Atlantic are located in Moncton, New Brunswick.

History
The company was founded in 1927 in Moncton as a small Agricultural supply agricultural co-operative whose main idea was to provide a means for local farmers to promote their livestock. Today the group has 128 member co-operative enterprises across Atlantic Canada and Quebec.

In 2015, Co-op Atlantic sold its grocery distribution operations to Sobeys. As part of the sale, Sobeys became the wholesale supplier for its member-owned grocery stores, while five Co-op grocery stores were sold to Sobeys and converted to Foodland, and five gas stations were sold to Sobeys and rebranded as either Shell or FastFuel.

Main enterprises
The following is a list of the main enterprises.

References

See also
List of Canadian supermarkets

Companies based in Moncton
Consumers' co-operatives of Canada
Food and drink in New Brunswick
Cuisine of Atlantic Canada